Maykop is the capital city of Adygea, Russia, located on the right bank of the Belaya River (a tributary of the Kuban). It borders Maykopsky District, from which it is administratively and municipally separate, to the east and south; Giaginsky District to the north, and Belorechensky District of Krasnodar Krai to the west. 

Population:

History
The city gave its name to the early Bronze Age Maykop culture after the discovery of a royal burial site there in 1897.

Following the establishment of a military camp in 1825, the Imperial Russian Army built a military fort at Maykop in 1857.

In 1910 oil deposits were discovered in the vicinity of Maykop. The city was the administrative center of the Maykopsky Otdel of the Kuban Oblast.

In 1936, Maykop and the surrounding region merged with Adyghe Autonomous Oblast and became the administrative centre of the autonomy. The Wehrmacht occupied Maykop on 10 August 1942 without a fight as a result of a Brandenburger commando operation. German attempts to re-start oil production in the scorched-earth area proved only minimally successful. On 29 January 1943, the Transcaucasian Front of the Red Army re-took the town.

Since 1991 Maykop has served as the capital of the Republic of Adygea in the Russian Federation.

Economy

The discovery of extensive underground oil reserves has made Maykop a major centre for oil extraction for the Soviet Union and, subsequently, Russia. Other economically important sectors are food processing and the timber industry.

Administrative and municipal status
Within the framework of administrative divisions, it is, together with eight rural localities, incorporated as Maykop Republican Urban Okrug—an administrative unit with the status equal to that of the districts. It has the following rural localities under its jurisdiction:
khutor of Gaverdovsky
stanitsa of Khanskaya
khutor of Kosinov
settlement of Podgorny
settlement of Rodnikovy
settlement of Severny
khutor of Vesyoly
settlement of Zapadny

As a municipal division, Maykop Republican Urban Okrug is incorporated as Maykop Urban Okrug.

Ethnic groups

Ethnic groups in the city (2010 data):
Russians (71.29%)
Adyghe (19.71%)
Armenians (3.03%)
Ukrainians (1.88%)
Other ethnic groups include Chechens, Daghestanis and Tatars. There are ethnic tensions between the Muslim Adyghe and the Russians—with the two communities described as being "sharply divided".

Education

Maykop is home to the Adyghe State University and Maykop State Technological University. There are also several facilities of professional education in Maykop.
There are a lot of schools. For example Adyghe Republican Gymnasium which is located near the mosque, the theatre and the park of friendship. It has 11 grades. There are a lot of rules: students must wear a uniform, girls must have pony tails or braids. The school has five buildings. There is a sports hall where students play basketball and volleyball. There is also a football pitch where boys play football. A canteen is a separate building.

Climate

Maykop lies within the humid subtropical climate zone (Cfa), according to the Köppen climate classification, or just within the humid continental climate (Dfa) zone according to the  demarcation used by many United States climatologists.

February 15, 2010 saw Maykop record the absolute maximum for any winter month in Russia: .

Military
On the south side of the city, alongside the Belaya River is the military complex housing the 131st Motor Rifle Brigade of the Southern Military District of the Russian Armed Forces which took part in the First Chechen War.

Notable people
Nikita Kucherov, professional ice hockey player

References

Notes

Sources

 
Kuban Oblast
Populated places established in 1857
1857 establishments in the Russian Empire
Populated places in Maykop Federal City